Ross Lake is a large reservoir in the North Cascade mountains of northern Washington state, United States, and southwestern British Columbia, Canada. The lake runs approximately north–south, is 23 miles (37 km) long, up to 1.5 miles (2.5 km) wide, and the full reservoir elevation is 1,604 feet above sea level (489 m).

The U.S. portion of Ross Lake is in the Ross Lake National Recreation Area.  North Cascades National Park is adjacent to the west and south, while the Pasayten Wilderness is east of the lake.  In British Columbia the lake is a part of Skagit Valley Provincial Park, and Manning Provincial Park is nearby to the east.

Hydrology

Ross Lake is formed by the impoundment of the Skagit River by Ross Dam, which is operated by Seattle City Light for hydroelectric power generation serving Seattle, Washington, and surrounding areas. After leaving Ross Lake, the Skagit River flows through two more reservoirs before running to Puget Sound.

High peaks surround Ross Lake in all directions, and include Hozomeen Mountain, Ruby Mountain, Desolation Peak, and Jack Mountain, the summit of which is over 7,000 feet above the elevation of the lake.  Rivers and creeks flowing into Ross Lake include the upper Skagit River, Hozomeen Creek, Silver Creek, Little Beaver Creek, Arctic Creek, Lightning Creek, Devils Creek, Big Beaver Creek, and Ruby Creek.  Most of these creeks originate from glaciers and snowfields high in the North Cascades.

History

Ross Dam, originally called Ruby Dam, was built in three stages between 1937 and 1949, and currently stands 540 feet (160 m) tall. A fourth stage of construction was planned for the dam; however, in 1984 Seattle City Light made an electricity-purchasing agreement with British Columbia which delayed any further expansion of the Ross Lake Dam for 80 years. The lake and dam are named after James D. Ross, the superintendent of the Seattle City Light's Skagit River Hydroelectric Project, which built the dam.

Recreation
Ross Lake is a major recreation destination within the North Cascades, attracting visitors with a multitude of fishing, canoeing, kayaking, and hiking opportunities. The trout fishing, in particular, is well-renowned. Ross Lake is not home to anadromous fish such as salmon or steelhead trout as natural barriers in the river prevented these fish from traveling upstream on the Skagit River any further than a few miles past the Gorge Powerhouse.
Camping is allowed at a number of boat-in and hike-in campsites around the lake. Backcountry camping permits (free, first-come, first-served) are required, and may be obtained from the National Park Service in Marblemount.

The lake is also home to a floating resort called the Ross Lake Resort.  Made up of several dozen cabins and bunkhouses, it is situated approximately a quarter mile from the dam and rests entirely on log booms.  During the winter, when lake levels shrink, the resort detaches from its shore moorings and relocates to the center of the lake.  This is due to lower water levels caused by annual drawdowns of the lake for flood control of the Skagit River.

A road from the Canadian side of the lake ends just inside the US. Travelers do not have to report to an official Port of Entry (as required at the nearby Pacific Crest Trail crossing), as they must reenter Canada to leave.

Climate
Ross Lake has a mediterranean climate (Köppen Csb).

See also
 Diablo Lake
 Skagit River Hydroelectric Project
 Ross Lake Fault

References

External links
National Park Service website for Ross Lake National Recreation Area
Chronology of Skagit River dams from the Skagit Valley Herald
Upper Skagit Watershed Photograph Project from Seattle Municipal Archives

Canada–United States border
Canadian Cascades
Lakes of the Lower Mainland
International lakes of North America
Lakes of British Columbia
North Cascades of Washington (state)
Ross
Mountain lakes
Lakes of Whatcom County, Washington
Protected areas of Whatcom County, Washington
Reservoirs and dams in National Park Service units